Donna North High School (DNHS) is a senior high school in unincorporated Hidalgo County, Texas, north of Donna and in the Rio Grande Valley region. It is a part of the Donna Independent School District.

Places in its attendance boundary include: Muniz,
 and small sections of Donna and Alamo.

References

External links
 

Public high schools in Texas
Schools in Hidalgo County, Texas